The 1995–96 VfL Bochum season was the 58th season in club history.

Review and events
The 1995–96 season was the first season in German football where teams received three points for a win (instead of two), and one point for a draw. Due to the German Football Association lifting the requirement of starting squads wearing jerseys with the numbers one to eleven, it was the first season for the VfL Bochum to assign numbers to its players and feature the players' names on their jerseys.

Matches

Legend

2. Bundesliga

DFB-Pokal

Squad

Squad and statistics

Squad, appearances and goals scored

Transfers

Summer

In:

Out:

Winter

In:

Out:

Sources

External links
 1995–96 VfL Bochum season at Weltfussball.de 
 1995–96 VfL Bochum season at kicker.de 
 1995–96 VfL Bochum season at Fussballdaten.de 

Bochum
VfL Bochum seasons